Unconventional myosin-VI, is a protein that in humans is coded for by MYO6. Unconventional myosin-VI is a myosin molecular motor involved in intracellular vesicle and organelle transport.

Structure 
Human myosin-VI contains a N-terminal myosin head domain (residues 59–759), two coiled coil motifs (residues 902–984 and 986–1009 respectively), and a C-terminal myosin VI cargo binding domain (residues 1177–1267).

Function 

Unconventional myosin-VI is unique because it travels in the opposite direction of other myosins, towards the negative end of actin filaments. Myosin-VI follows the same structure as other myosin but with two unique "inserts" allowing for its diversified properties. One insert is called the "reverse gear" and is responsible for its movement towards the negative end of actin filaments. The reverse gear is located on the neck region of the myosin and acts as a reorienting device for the lever arm to move backwards after myosin movement. The second insert assists in regulating ATP enzyme activity located in the motor head domain.

There are 3 amino acid binding sites essential for myosin-VI's interactions, Arg-Arg-Leu and Trp-Trp-Tyr in the tail region and Met-Ile-Sec in the helix. The Arg-Arg-Leu amino acid segment (abbreviated RRL) takes part in ubiquitin interactions while Trp-Trp-Tyr (abbreviated WWY) assists in interactions with DAB2. Myosin-VI's Met-Ile-Sec bonding interactions are limited to the myosin-VI long isoform but interact with clathrin in endocytosis.

Myosin-VI long isoform is formed by the inclusion of exon 31, adding an addition alpha-helix, restriction RRL interactions. Myosin-VI long struggles to interact with ubiquitin chains and GIPC1 due to this structural formation, however, increases attractivity to clathrin. Myosin-VI's structural flexibility provides a great width in interaction ability with its environment and interactors.

Interactions 

MYO6 has been shown to interact with GIPC1, DAB2., ubiquitin, and clathrin. Myosin VI, being a motor protein, focuses its interactions by moving along actin filaments. This however does not limit its functions, because MYO6 is heavily involved in cytokinesis, creation of membrane compartments, and the regulation and organization of actin filaments.

Clinical significance 
Mutations in the MYO6 gene are associated with hearing loss. MYO6 has also been found to be involved in many events in spermiogenesis in numerous different creatures. In common fruit flies (Drosophila), the myosin-VI ortholog controls the sterility of males by organization of actin involved in spermatid individualization. This same ortholog in roundworms (C. elegans) regulates the separation of cytosol in spermatid formation due to its influence in cytokinesis. In mice, this ortholog will control specialization and membrane compartment creation.

References

Further reading

External links